Neyyattinkara State assembly constituency is one of the 140 state legislative assembly constituencies at the state Kerala in southern India. It is also one of the 7 state legislative assembly constituencies included in the Thiruvananthapuram Lok Sabha constituency. As of the 2021 assembly elections, the current MLA is K. Ansalan of CPI(M).

Local self governed segments
Neyyattinkara Niyamasabha constituency is composed of the following local self governed segments:

Members of Legislative Assembly 
The following list contains all members of Kerala legislative assembly who have represented the constituency:

Key

Election results 
Percentage change (±%) denotes the change in the number of votes from the previous election.

Niyamasabha Election 2021

Niyamasabha Election 2016 
There were 1,78,942 registered voters in the constituency for the 2016 Kerala Niyamasabha Election.

2012 by-election 
Due to the resignation of sitting CPI(M) MLA R. Selvaraj, Neyyatinkara went to bypolls on June 6, 2012. There were 1,64,856 registered voters in the constituency for this election. R. Selvaraj, now contesting for INC, won the election by a margin of 6,334 votes.

Niyamasabha Election 2011 
There were 1,57,851 registered voters in the constituency for the 2011 election.

See also
 Neyyattinkara
 Thiruvananthapuram district
 List of constituencies of the Kerala Legislative Assembly
 2016 Kerala Legislative Assembly election

References 

Assembly constituencies of Kerala

State assembly constituencies in Thiruvananthapuram district